Ethmia susa is a moth in the family Depressariidae. It is found in Taiwan. Adults are on wing from March to September.

References

Moths described in 2000
susa